Intenium GmbH is a European publisher and distributor of casual games designed for females. The company focuses on social and casual multiplayer online gaming, including Bonga Online, Alamandi and an unannounced product that was first unveiled in closed beta at the very end of 2012.

Intenium started with downloadable games and now operates an online distribution network in Western Europe and has access to European retail chains. After years of work in the game business the following consumer brands were established: Deutschland Spielt, Screenseven, Insider Tales, and Alamandi (in partnership with Ravensburger).

About the company 
Intenium is headquartered in Hamburg, Germany.  The game development branch - Intenium Studio - is based in Kaliningrad, Russia.

Intenium maintains strong relationships with online and retail distribution partners in Europe (such as Saturn, Karstadt, Auchan, Bart Smit, and Tesco). Currently, Intenium launches around 200 new products each year.

Intenium holds IP rights to a number of casual games on several platforms. Games are released in English, German, French, Dutch, Spanish, Italian, Sweden, Polish, Russian, Korean and Japanese. Among self-developed series of products are the following: Beetle Bug, Lost Lagoon, Insider Tales, and Diamond Drop.

Business model 
Intenium uses freemium as their main business model, where their games are accessible free of charge, but a premium is charged for advanced features by way of microtransactions or via subscription.

Downloadable games have historically played a big role for Intenium, being some of the first games that the business started with. Therefore, the business model called try before you buy is also widely used within the company in its classical offerings.

Furthermore, Intenium’s own CDs are carried by retailers under the Deutschland Spielt brand.

Distribution network 
The distribution network of Intenium consists of their own national Deutschland-Spielt and their own international casual game portals as well as internationally active partner portals in the USA, UK, France, Scandinavia, Russia, and the Netherlands, as well as Bild.de and Sat1.de, bringing gaming sections to their portals.

Alamandi 

Alamandi is a free-to-play multiplayer online game world targeted at core casual game consumers.

The game allows users to travel between different locations while co-operatively solving different tasks in the online world and, at the same time, exploring it. Players can go to one of the mini-games and compete for treasures, customize their game characters and build their own home in the world of Alamandi. Most recognized by players of the mini-games are Turtle (a match-3 game), bingo and yahtzee.

Alamandi is characterized by numerous social networking elements and extensive interaction opportunities between the players. Playing in Alamandi is free. Business model is based on microtransactions (item-selling, game credits) and subscription (Memberships), which isn’t mandatory for the players.

Bonga Online 
On November 17, 2011, INTENIUM launched the Open Beta version of this browser-based online game, Bonga Online.

Bonga Online is the first browser online game in company’s portfolio. It was developed in their own development unit, INTENIUM Studio, in Kaliningrad. Gameplay was developed specifically for the female audience and is based on principle of Tamagotchi.

In the middle of 2012, Bonga Online launched on Facebook and a number of other social networks.

In January 2013, Bonga Online was nominated for Best Casual Browser MMO of 2013 presented by Game Genetics. The MMO of the Year 2013 features a total of 20 categories across all platforms. As stated in voting rules, there are two titles awarded per category, one voted by the jurors and the other one by the audience. Counting more than half a million visitors and fifty thousand validated votes, last year's contest has been the biggest one so far.

Company products

Online games 
 Alamandi
 Bonga Online

Downloadable games 

 Azteca
 Beetle Ju by OXXO Media and Alawar Entertainment
 Beetle Bug
 Beetle Bug 2
 Beetle Bug 3
 Bengal
 Chicken Attack
 Chicken Attack Deluxe
 Revenge of the Chicken by OXXO Media and Alawar Entertainment
 Chicken’s Revenge Deluxe
 Diamond Drop by OXXO Media and Alawar Entertainment
 Diamond Drop 2
 Elven Mists
 Elven Mists 2
 Fairy Jewels
 Fairy Jewels 2
 Neptunia
 Scepter of Ra
 Green Valley
 Insider Tales: The Stolen Venus
 Insider Tales: The Secret of Casanova
 Insider Tales: Vanished in Rome
 Insider Tales: The Stolen Venus 2
 Lost Lagoon: The Trail of Destiny
 Lost Lagoon 2: Cursed & Forgotten
 Tulula: The Secret Of The Volcano
 Aerie: The Spirit of The Forest
 Exorcist
 Exorcist 2
 Exorcist 3: Inception of Darkness
 Sandra Fleming Chronicles: Crystal Skulls
 Whispered Stories: Sandman
 Gardens Inc.: From Rakes to Riches

References 

Video game companies of Germany